A Second Childhood (also known as Endless Youth) is a 2010 Italian drama film directed by Pupi Avati.

Cast 

 Fabrizio Bentivoglio: Lino Settembre
 Francesca Neri: Francesca
 Serena Grandi: Aunt Amabile
 Gianni Cavina: Preda
 Lino Capolicchio: Emilio
 Manuela Morabito: Teta 
 Erika Blanc: The Widow
 Isabelle Adriani: Nicoletta
 Vincenzo Crocitti: Don Nico

References

External links

2010 films
Italian drama films
2010 drama films
Films directed by Pupi Avati
Films about Alzheimer's disease
Films scored by Riz Ortolani
2010s Italian films